Berwickshire was a county constituency of the House of Commons of the Parliament of the United Kingdom from 1708 to 1918, when it was amalgamated with neighbouring Haddington(shire) to form a new Berwick and Haddington constituency.

Creation
The British parliamentary constituency was created in 1708 following the Acts of Union, 1707 and replaced the former Parliament of Scotland shire constituency of Berwickshire. It elected one Member of Parliament (MP), using the first-past-the-post voting system.

Members of Parliament

Election results

Elections in the 1830s

Marjoribanks resigned, causing a by-election.

Elections in the 1840s

Elections in the 1850s

Elections in the 1860s

Elections in the 1870s
Robertson was elevated to the peerage, becoming Lord Marjoribanks and causing a by-election.

Elections in the 1880s

Marjoribanks was appointed Comptroller of the Household, requiring a by-election.

Elections in the 1890s

Elections in the 1900s

Elections in the 1910s

References

Sources

Historic parliamentary constituencies in Scotland (Westminster)
Berwickshire
Constituencies of the Parliament of the United Kingdom established in 1708
Constituencies of the Parliament of the United Kingdom disestablished in 1918
Politics of the Scottish Borders